Thomas Elwood may refer to:

Thomas Ellwood (1639–1714), English religious writer
Thomas Elwood (MP) (died 1612), English politician